Tengelmann Warenhandelsgesellschaft KG, doing business as the Tengelmann Group, is a holding company based in Mülheim an der Ruhr, Germany.

Structure
The corporation has the following subsidiaries:

KiK Textilien und Non-Food GmbH, with over 3,000 branches in Germany, 235 in Austria, 2 in Czech Rep. and 1 in Slovenia
Obi Bau- und Heimwerkermärkte GmbH & Co. Franchise Center KG, a DIY store chain with 340 locations in Germany and 175 in Europe.

Sold supermarket chains
Kaiser’s Tengelmann, 531 retail outlets sold to Edeka in January 2017, which in turn transferred 25% of the outlets to REWE as dictated by the German Federal Cartel Office; all stores were rebranded according to the brands of their new owners
Plus Discount spol. s r. o. (Czech Republic) with 134 branches sold to REWE-Beteiligungs-Holding International GmbH
Plus Hellas E.P.E. & Sia E.E. (Greece) with 32 branches sold to Alfa-Beta Vassilopoulos
Plus Élelmiszer Diszkont Kft. (Hungary) with 174 Plus (in 2008) and 22 Kaiser's (in 2003) branches sold to Spar Magyarország Kereskedelmi Kft.
Plus Discount Bulgaria 25 branches (sold to Lidl & Schwarz)
Plus Discount sp. z o.o. (Poland) with 183 branches sold to Jerónimo Martins
Plus Discount-Supermercados Lda. (Portugal) with 72 branches sold to Jerónimo Martins
Plus Discount Romania S.C.S.  (Romania) with 100 branches (sold to Lidl & Schwarz)
Plus Supermercados, S. A. (Spain) with 238 branches sold to Carrefour and rebranded as Dia
The Great Atlantic & Pacific Tea Company, exited as stockholder in 2012
Plus Österreich,  Warenhandels-AG  (Austria), formerly Löwa, mostly badged as Zielpunkt, with 300 supermarkets. Also includes former branches of the defunct  and Julius Meinl chains. Sold to Blue O in 2010.

References

External links

 The Tengelmann Group
 The Tengelmann Group 
 The Tengelmann Group (Archive, 2003–2004, 2006)

Companies based in North Rhine-Westphalia
F. W. Woolworth Company
Holding companies of Germany
Mülheim
Privately held companies of Germany
The Great Atlantic & Pacific Tea Company